The 2004 presidential campaign of Fernando Poe Jr. was formally launched on November 26, 2003, upon announcing his candidacy at the Manila Hotel in the City of Manila. Poe was the Koalisyon ng Nagkakaisang Pilipino (KNP)'s nominee for President of the Philippines in the 2004 election. He chose Loren Legarda, the sitting Majority Floor Leader of the Philippine Senate, as his vice presidential running mate on January 1, 2004. A public figure in his movie career and known for his charitable but unpublicized endeavours, he targeted his candidacy at the same poor whom he championed in his films.
Poe accepted the nomination in December 2003 and was to be the standard opposition bearer for the Philippines' 2004 presidential election. Some accounts portray him as a reluctant candidate who was only prevailed upon to accept the nomination by his best friend, deposed former President Joseph Estrada. But other accounts say he was convinced to cast his bid for the presidency because of the overwhelming crowd that gathered for the first rally of the FPJ for President Movement at the Cuneta Astrodome in Pasay.

Disqualification case
One of the primary issues that Poe faced during the campaign period were three disqualification cases filed before the Commission on Elections (Comelec) by attorneys Maria Jeanette C. Tecson, Zoilo Antonio Velez and Victorino X. Fornier. These cases were subsequently consolidated and elevated to the Supreme Court. Even though Poe was born in the Philippines, the lawyers who filed the disqualification cases argued that he was not a natural-born Filipino, a requirement for a presidential candidate. They argued that he was an illegitimate child who should have followed the citizenship of his American mother. They further argued that Poe's father was not a Filipino because records indicated that Poe's father was a Spanish national. The Supreme Court voted 8–5, with one abstention, in favor of Poe. The high court upheld the previous Comelec ruling and declared Poe was a "natural-born citizen and qualified to run". Supreme Court Justice Hilario Davide Jr. said a preponderance of evidence established that Poe's father was a Filipino because Poe's grandfather, Lorenzo, had not declared allegiance to Spain by virtue of the Treaty of Paris and the Philippine Bill of 1902. Davide said that, in the case of an illegitimate child whose father is a Filipino and whose mother is an alien, proof of paternity is enough for the child to take after the citizenship of his putative father.

Death of Atty. Maria Jeanette C. Tecson
On September 28, 2007, 8:30 p.m, Maria Jeanette Tecson, one of the lawyers who filed a case against Fernando Poe Jr in 2004, was found dead — with multiple wounds in her throat and wrist — in room 204, of the Richmonde Hotel on San Miguel Avenue, Ortigas Center, Pasig. Senior Supt. Francisco Uyami, Pasig police chief stated that the limbs of Tecson's body were already stiff when the corpse was found, suggesting that the 40-year-old lawyer was already several hours dead before her remains were discovered.

Campaign period

Political critics charged Poe of being heavily linked to political interest groups, and tried to compare his candidacy to that of Estrada, who ran on a similar platform, but was deposed from office and put under house arrest after numerous corruption scandals. While initially seen as the frontrunner in the campaign, his performance in opinion polls was eventually surpassed by the incumbent Gloria Macapagal Arroyo, who did win the election. The poll protest was later thrown out by the Supreme Court acting as the Presidential Electoral Tribunal There is a controversy, known as the Hello Garci scandal, on whether Gloria Macapagal Arroyo had actually won the elections due to allegations of vote rigging, but this was denied by Arroyo.

Poll protest
After Poe's unsuccessful bid to the presidency, his supporters, which include the deposed Estrada's supporters, viewed the election results as flawed, and came under legal protest by Poe and his vice-presidential running-mate, former Senator Loren Legarda. The poll protest was later thrown out by the Supreme Court acting as the Presidential Electoral Tribunal, as well as Legarda's protest.

Public opinion
On January 25, 2008, a Pulse Asia survey (commissioned by the Genuine Opposition (GO) per former Senator Sergio Osmeña III) stated that 58% percent of Filipinos in Mindanao believed that President Gloria Macapagal Arroyo cheated in the 2004 Philippine general election. 70% also "believed that because of recurring allegations of election fraud, the credibility of the balloting process in Mindanao was at a record low."
Many Pangasinenses, on the other hand, still find it really hard to believe that Poe got no votes at all in the municipality of Santo Tomas, Pangasinan.

Aftermath
Fernando Poe Jr. died on December 14, 2004, after three days in comatose due to dizziness in the Christmas party at his production studio.

12 years after FPJ's presidential run, his adopted daughter Grace Poe ran in the 2016 presidential election, finishing third in the vote count with over nine million votes.

References

2004 Philippine presidential election
Election campaigns in the Philippines